Orphan Kids Withdrawn Out of This Comedy is the seventh studio album by Echo Orbiter.  It was released on Looking Glass Workshop in 2008.  The album has been described as “a collection of superb three-minute pop bursts,” combining "uber-catchy British Invasion style, four-on-the-floor garage burners with heavy new wave influenced synth lines."

Track listing

Credits
Justin Emerle - guitar, vocals, keyboards
Colin Emerle - bass guitar

References

External links
Orphan Kids Withdrawn Out Of This Comedy

2008 albums
Echo Orbiter albums